Jump diffusion is a stochastic process that involves jumps and diffusion. It has important applications in magnetic reconnection, coronal mass ejections, condensed matter physics, option pricing, and pattern theory and computational vision.

In physics 

In crystals, atomic diffusion typically consists of jumps between vacant lattice sites. On time and length scales that average over many single jumps, the net motion of the jumping atoms can be described as regular diffusion.

Jump diffusion can be studied on a microscopic scale by inelastic neutron scattering and by Mößbauer spectroscopy. Closed expressions for the autocorrelation function have been derived for several jump(-diffusion) models:
 Singwi, Sjölander 1960: alternation between oscillatory motion and directed motion
 Chudley, Elliott 1961: jumps on a lattice
 Sears 1966, 1967: jump diffusion of rotational degrees of freedom
 Hall, Ross 1981:  jump diffusion within a restricted volume

In economics and finance 
In option pricing, a jump-diffusion model is a form of mixture model, mixing a jump process and a diffusion process. Jump-diffusion models have been introduced by Robert C. Merton as an extension of jump models. Due to their computational tractability, the special case of a basic affine jump diffusion is popular for some credit risk and short-rate models.

In pattern theory, computer vision, and medical imaging 
In pattern theory and computational vision in medical imaging, jump-diffusion processes were first introduced by Grenander and Miller
as a form of random sampling algorithm that mixes "focus"-like motions, the diffusion processes, with saccade-like motions, via jump processes.
The approach modelled sciences of electron-micrographs as containing multiple shapes, each having some fixed dimensional representation, with the collection of micrographs filling out the sample space corresponding to the unions of multiple finite-dimensional spaces. 
Using techniques from pattern theory, a posterior probability model was constructed over the countable union of sample space; this is therefore a  hybrid system model, containing the discrete notions of object number along with the continuum notions of shape.
The jump-diffusion process was constructed to have ergodic properties so that after initially flowing away from its initial condition it would generate samples from the posterior probability model.

See also
 Jump process, an example of jump diffusion
 Piecewise-deterministic Markov process (PDMP), an example of jump diffusion and a generalization of the jump process
 Hybrid system (in the context of dynamical systems), a generalization of jump diffusion

References

Stochastic processes
Options (finance)